RCCS may stand for:
 Rofeh Cholim Cancer Society
 Rotary Cell Culture System
 Royal Canadian Corps of Signals